Lee Ye-jun (born July 22, 1991) is a South Korean male curler.

Teams

References

External links

Living people
1991 births
Sportspeople from Gangwon Province, South Korea
South Korean male curlers
21st-century South Korean people